Ali Sanogo (born 20 October 1998) is an Ivorian professional footballer who plays as a forward.

References 

1998 births
Living people
Ivorian footballers
Association football forwards
R.F.C. Seraing (1922) players
Challenger Pro League players
Belgian Pro League players
Ivorian expatriate footballers
Expatriate footballers in Belgium
Ivorian expatriate sportspeople in Belgium